The Inspector Montalbano television series are Italian police procedural stories. Based on Andrea Camilleri's detective novels, they are located in the imaginary town of Vigàta, Sicily, which is based on Camilleri's native Porto Empedocle. The series star Salvo Montalbano is the police chief, or commissario.

The music for the soundtrack was composed by Franco Piersanti.

Inspector Montalbano was produced and broadcast by RAI to critical acclaim. It premiered on Rai 2, and then, since the fourth series, on Rai 1. Over 65 countries have broadcast the series, including on BBC Four in the United Kingdom, MHz WorldView in the United States and SBS in Australia. In 2012, the series generated a spin-off, The Young Montalbano.

Synopsis

Inspector Salvo Montalbano is in charge of the state police station in Vigàta, a fictional town in the fictional province of Montelusa (see locations) in Sicily, Southern Italy. Montalbano investigates criminal acts which he always manages to solve by reconstruction thanks to his intelligence and the help of his team which includes his deputy, Domenico 'Mimì' Augello, Giuseppe Fazio, Galluzzo, and Agatino Catarella. Salvo has a long-distance, tempestuous relationship with Livia Burlando who lives in Genoa.

Among his external collaborators are:
 his Swedish friend, Ingrid Sjöström who lives in neighbouring Montelusa
 the journalist, Nicolò Zito
 Vigàta's local forensic pathologist Dr. Marco Pasquano
 his cook and housekeeper, Adelina Cirrinciò

Cast

Main characters
 Luca Zingaretti as Inspector Salvo Montalbano, the police chief of Vigàta (season 1−15)
 Cesare Bocci as Inspector Domenico "Mimì" Augello, Montalbano's deputy and close friend (season 1−15)
 Peppino Mazzotta as Detective Giuseppe Fazio, and Montalbano's right-hand man (season 1−15)
 Angelo Russo as Agatino Catarella, police officer (season 1−15)
 Davide Lo Verde as Galluzzo, police officer (seasons 1–15)
 Roberto Nobile as Nicolò Zito, journalist of local TV station Rete Libera and trusted friend of Montalbano (season 1−15)
 Marcello Perracchio as Dr. Marco Pasquano, forensic pathologist (seasons 1–11)
 Katharina Böhm (dubbed by Claudia Catani) as Livia Burlando, Montalbano's girlfriend who lives in Genoa and sometimes visits Vigàta (seasons 1–4)
 Claudia Catani provided the Italian voice of Livia Burlando, Montalbano's girlfriend who lives in Genoa for Katharina Böhm (seasons 1-4) and Lina Perned (season 9) and as Livia's voice on the telephone (seasons 5-8)
 Lina Perned (dubbed by Claudia Catani) as Livia Burlando, Montalbano's girlfriend who lives in Genoa and sometimes visits Vigàta (season 9)
 Sonia Bergamasco as Livia Burlando, Montalbano's girlfriend who lives in Genoa and sometimes visits Vigàta (season 10−15)

Recurring characters
Isabell Sollman as Ingrid, Montalbano's Swedish friend (seasons 2–5, 7–8, 11)
 Mirella Petralia as Adelina Cirrinciò, Montalbano's housekeeper/cook (seasons 4, 7 and 9)
 Ketty Governali as Adelina Cirrinciò, Montalbano's housekeeper/cook (seasons 11, 12)
 Fabio Costanzo as Pasquale Cirrinciò, Adelina's son (seasons 4, 7, 9 and 12)
 Carmelinda Gentile as Beatrice "Beba" Di Leo, becomes Mimì's wife (main: season 5; guest: seasons 3–4, 6–8, 12)
 Giovanni Guardiano as Jacomuzzi, police forensics specialist (seasons 1–5, 8, 12–13)
 Giacinto Ferro (1943–2016) as Police Chief Bonetti-Alderighi, Montalbano's superior based in the provincial capital, Montelusa (seasons 1, 4–5, 7–9, 11)
 Giovanni Visentin as Judge Tommaseo, morbidly attracted to the more spicy aspects of the cases (seasons 7-9, 11)
 Filippo Brazzaventre as Filippo Ragonese, political journalist at local TV station Televigàta (seasons 4–10)
 Ubaldo Lo Presti as Filippo Ragonese, political journalist at local TV station Televigàta (seasons 1–2)
 Francesco Stella as Gallo, police officer (seasons 1–2)
 Marco Cavallaro as Tortorella, police officer (seasons 4–6)
 Corrado Invernizzi as Lattes, Bonetti-Alderighi's secretary (seasons 1-3, 8)
 Francesco Sineri as Don Balduccio Sinagra, retired mafia boss (seasons 3–5)

Series and episodes

Production
Each closely follows the plot of the novels, in some cases joining several short stories. Alberto Sironi (it), who died suddenly in early August 2019, had directed the entire series up till then. He was taken ill during the filming of three new episodes in 2019 and Luca Zingaretti took over the direction. Camilleri was teaching at the same time that Zingaretti was studying at the Accademia Nazionale di Arte Drammatica Silvio D'Amico. Luca Zingaretti had to adjust his accent to Sicilian having been born in Rome. Inspector Montalbano was initially launched on Rai 2. It moved to Rai 1 after the second series.

Austrian actress Katharina Böhm, then Lina Perned, both dubbed by Claudia Catani, and now Sonia Bergamasco plays his girlfriend, Livia. Cesare Bocci plays his deputy and Peppino Mazzotta plays his most trusted detective Fazio.

Filming

Although Camilleri set his books in a fictionalised province of Agrigento, much of the series is filmed in the province of Ragusa. The exteriors of la Mànnara were filmed  at Fornace Penna in Sampieri. Montalbano's offices are in Scicli, as are the offices of Commissioner Bonetti-Alderighi (actually those of the mayor). Filming is in Ragusa Ibla, Modica, Donnafugata Castle and the Donnalucata, Pozzallo and Scoglitti ports, Marina di Ragusa, Comiso, Santa Croce Camerina, Sampieri, Acate, and other places in south-eastern Sicily. The opening shots in the series include the Guerrieri Viaduct in Modica. The Coast Guard office in Scoglitti, in reality, is the small lighthouse museum.

List of main locations
 Ragusa
 Punta Secca
 Modica
 Scicli
 Donnalucata
 Comiso
 Chiaramonte Gulfi
 Ispica
 Pozzallo
 Vittoria
 Scoglitti
 Sampieri
 Acate

International transmission
The BBC holds the United Kingdom transmission rights. "Excursion to Tindari" and "Montalbano's Croquettes" were shown on BBC Four in December 2008. On 11 February 2012, "The Snack Thief" was broadcast in its 9 pm Saturday evening slot. On 25 August 2012, BBC Four began to broadcast a series of 12 episodes. From 19 October to 9 November 2013, the four series nine episodes were broadcast and referred to as Series 3. In June 2014, BBC Four began a re-run of all existing episodes and this time commencing in the correct running order. However the episodes (as detailed in dates above) for series 8 were shown in a different order than the Italian sequence. This remains the U.K. sequence for the BBC iPlayer stream.

In the United States, the series is retitled Detective Montalbano and streams on MHz Choice.

In Australia, the series was shown on Special Broadcasting Service in Italian, subtitled in English by SBS staff.

In France, it was shown in winter 2013 on France 3 on Sundays with the title Commissaire Montalbano. In Spain, it was on La 2 on Saturdays in spring 2013 and in Argentina on the Europa channel.

DVD release

MHz Networks distributes the Detective Montalbano series on TV, DVD, TVOD and SVOD.

In the UK, the earlier episodes are currently available in both a collection and series format, with the series numbering following BBC Four's. These titles are distributed by Acorn Media UK.

In the Nordic countries the first 18 films are available as Box 1 (1–6), Box 2 (7–12) and Box 3 (13–18).  All were released in 2009 (labelled 1999, the start date of the series) with Danish, Finnish, Norwegian and Swedish subtitles. They were released by AtlanticFilms AB on license from RAI Trade.

In Spain, there is a confusing situation where episodes are dubbed in Spanish, as well as Italian with Spanish subtitles being available in both box sets containing six episodes each and overlapping mini box sets containing two films each. Both are labelled, Colección Montalbano in identical boxes just to add to the confusion. Distribution is by Track Media SL.

Awards
 2003 Busto Arsizio Film Festival: Winner Best TV Series 
 2009 Kineo Awards, Italy: Winner Best Television Film
 2011 Kineo Awards, Italy: Winner Best Television Film
 2014 Crime Thriller Awards, UK: Nominee Best International TV Drama
 2016 TV Award - TV Direction Award: Winner Best fiction

See also
 List of Italian television series
 List of police television dramas

References

External links
 

1999 Italian television series debuts
Italian crime television series
RAI original programming
Sveriges Television original programming
Andrea Camilleri
1990s Italian television series
2000s Italian television series
2010s Italian television series
Detective television series

de:Andrea Camilleri#Commissario Montalbano